This is a list of shapeshifters appearing in legend, folklore and fiction.

Human turning into an animal

 Animagus
 Berserker (werebear)
 Ijiraq
 Merpeople
 Nagual
 Nanaue (wereshark) - the shark-man of Hawaiian legend
 Nereus
 Púca
 Skin-walker
 Wendigo
 Werecat
 Werehyena
 Werejaguar
 Werewolf

Animal turning into a human
 Bak (Assamese aqueous creature)
Bakeneko (cat)
 Boto Encantado (river dolphin)
 Inkling (from Splatoon)
 Jorōgumo (spider)
 Kitsune, Huli Jing and Kumiho (fox)
 Kushtaka (Otter)
 Lady White Snake, Ichchhadhari Nag and Yuxa (snake)
 Myrmidons (ant)
 Pipa Jing (jade pipa)
 Selkie (seal)
 Tanuki (racoon dog)
 Toyotama-hime (crocodile or shark)
 Tsuru Nyōbō (crane)

Other
 Ala
 Aswang
 Banshee (from Teen Wolf)
 Changeling
 Cybertronian (from Transformers)
 Demon
 Doppelgänger
 Dr. Jekyll/Mr. Hyde
 Empousa
 Felicity (from Rainbow Butterfly Unicorn Kitty)
 Grimm (from RWBY)
 Hellhound (from Teen Wolf)
 Hemkas (from Hanazuki: Full of Treasures)
 Lamia
 Manananggal
 Mangkukulam
 Mimic
 Pennywise (from Stephen King's It)
 Rakshasa
 Tengu
 Tiyanak
 Were-car (from Futurama)
 Yaksha

References

 
shapeshifters
 
-